Richard Webber, M.D., F.A.C.S is a fictional character from the ABC medical drama television series Grey's Anatomy. The character was created by Shonda Rhimes and is portrayed by actor James Pickens Jr. since the start of the show in 2005. At the beginning of the show, he is the Chief of Surgery at Seattle Grace Mercy West Hospital for 12 years. In season 6, he has to resign his position as chief and is briefly replaced by Derek Shepherd (Patrick Dempsey). Webber takes his position back as chief in season 7 but eventually resigns again in season 8 in order to protect Meredith Grey (Ellen Pompeo). He goes back to being General Surgery attending, although all the staff still calls him "Chief" due to his history. Later, Richard accepts to become the head of the residency program mentoring the residents. In season 17 Richard is appointed Chief of Chiefs of the Catherine Fox foundation.

He is a recovering alcoholic and this storyline is exploited in many episodes through the years, especially in seasons 6 and 15. Webber had an affair with Ellis Grey, Meredith's mother, before the beginning of the series and this impacts his relationship with several characters of the series such as his wife Adele (Loretta Devine) and Maggie Pierce, hospital surgeon who is later revealed to be his daughter.

Background
Richard Webber was born in 1954, the oldest of three children. His siblings are former hardware store owner Chris Webber, the father of his now-deceased niece, Sabrina and an unnamed younger sister. His mother was a music teacher and former receptionist Gail Webber, who played the cello. Gail (born 1918) died at age 46, when Richard was ten years old (circa 1964). Richard is not close to his younger siblings; they believe he thinks he is better than they are because he is a doctor. It is not known what inspired Webber to become a doctor or surgeon. 

Richard married his wife, Adele (Loretta Devine) on Valentine's Day. During their residency at Seattle Grace, he had an affair with Meredith's mother, Ellis Grey, although both were married to other people. Although Ellis left her husband, Richard could not bring himself to leave his wife, Adele (he would learn decades later that Adele had known about the affair all along and stayed with him anyway). He confessed in a later episode that he ended the affair because he believed that Ellis deserved better and that he had too much baggage. However, in Season 11, Webber admits to Meredith that his ego was simply jealous of Ellis' success as a surgeon, which is why the affair ended. After completing his residency, Richard left Seattle Grace to complete his fellowship. There are continuity errors regarding where exactly Richard built his career; at one point he states that with the exception of his fellowship, he spent his entire career at Seattle Grace. However, it is also established that he both taught and befriended Addison and Derek, presumably in New York (the majority of references within the show, as well as additional sources, indicate that a good portion of Richard's career was spent in Manhattan, rather than Seattle). He graduated from Northwestern University (as shown in the degree in his office)

Storylines

The enigmatic Chief of Surgery at Seattle Grace is a leading figure in the show. Always vigilant, seeking and trying new things, his ambition is to see Seattle Grace as the top surgical program in the country. This sometimes leads him to make daring decisions.  In the first season, the surgical program is presented as one of the best in the United States. Later in the series, his wife Adele asks him to retire, forcing him to choose between his career and their marriage. He tries to skirt around it, but Adele, tired of waiting, makes her choice and leaves him. He moves out and sleeps in his office for a short time. Since he learned of Ellis Grey's illness, Richard began visiting her regularly, but upon deciding to attempt a reconciliation with Adele, he realizes that he can no longer continue his emotional affair with Ellis. He attempts to patch things up with his wife, but is stunned to find out that she has apparently moved on to someone else. In the meantime, Richard makes plans to retire and must name his successor. He first thought of recommending Dr. Preston Burke (Isaiah Washington) as his successor, but after the secret of Burke's tremor and cover-up came out, that plan is put on hold. Nevertheless, he tells the hospital board of his retirement but has yet to name his successor; Dr. Derek Shepherd (Patrick Dempsey), Preston, Dr. Addison Montgomery (Kate Walsh) and Dr. Mark Sloan (Eric Dane) are all eagerly clamoring for the post. Richard eventually chooses Derek, but Derek tells Richard that he should remain chief.

Near the end of the third season, Adele is admitted to the hospital and is discovered to be pregnant (at 52 years old).  Though he believes the father to be the man Adele insinuated to be seeing months earlier, Richard stays by Adele's side as she is treated. However, due to complications, she loses the baby. Adele later admits to Richard that the baby, which was a boy, was actually his. At the conclusion of the third season, Richard and Adele decide to give their marriage another try.

At the beginning of the fourth season, Richard and Adele declare that his work is the reason that their marriage has failed and separate. He consequently moves in with his friend Derek Shepherd in his trailer home and tries to repair his life as a divorcée for the remainder of the season until, by the end, he reasserts his good reputation to his wife and wins her back.

At the start of the fifth season, Richard starts to deal with the fact that Seattle Grace's surgical program ranking has been suffering. Determined to repair his hospital's reputation, he has become determined to enforce a new tougher series of hospital rules. Adding to his new behavior, he seems to becoming more and more agitated by Meredith Grey's (Ellen Pompeo) presence in his life as she is a reminder to him of every mistake he has made over the years. Over the course of the season, he becomes resentful of his mentee in General Surgery, Dr. Bailey (Chandra Wilson)'s decision to leave the General Surgery program to embark upon a fellowship in Pediatric Surgery and attempts to prevent it in any way possible; he gives her an uninspiring letter of recommendation and buys a surgical robot for General Surgery to "lure" Dr. Bailey back to the program. However, as he finally comes to terms with Dr. Bailey's choice, she confides to the Chief that her husband has left her with an ultimatum - if she takes the fellowship in Pediatrics, he will divorce her. Dr. Bailey tells the Chief that she has decided that she will leave her husband herself, but that she still cannot take the Pediatrics fellowship, because she will now be a single mother.

In the sixth season, he has been under a lot of stress. In the episode "New History" many of his colleagues believe he is having an affair due to his odd decisions and mistakes lately, but it is revealed at the end of the episode that the chief has gone back to drinking again. At first, he tells Meredith, who he has taken under his wing to help out learning new skills, that he wasn't an alcoholic, but rather in a state of depression, and he promised that his eggnog at Christmas would be his last drink. However Meredith discovers him at the bar very drunk, showing that he has indeed relapsed. He was given the choice by Derek and the board, to retire early or enter a rehab program where he would receive help for his drinking, and possibly gain his job back. Richard contemplated throwing away his career, which caused him and Derek to get in a shouting match. He later handed Derek the papers agreeing to enter rehab. After rehab, Richard returns as a General Surgery attending and performs awake surgery on Harper Avery. On the day of the shooting, he enters the hospital against police orders and presumably convinces Gary Clarke to shoot himself.

Following the shooting, Derek impulsively quits as Chief and Richard is re-instated. It appears that his wife Adele is starting to show early symptoms of Alzheimer's and he starts a diabetes clinical trial based on Ellis' diaries. When he asks Meredith to be a part of his trial, she declines and joins Derek's trial on Alzheimer's instead. Adele later receives a spot on Derek's trial. During the trial, Meredith tampers with the drugs so that Adele does not receive the placebo. After the truth is revealed, which causes Meredith to lose her job, Richard takes the blame and steps down as chief of surgery to protect her, being replaced by Dr. Owen Hunt (Kevin McKidd). As Adele's condition deteriorates, Richard is forced to have her placed at Rose Ridge. Catherine Avery (Debbie Allen) comes to Seattle and develops an interest in Richard but he refuses her advances because he is a married man. However, discovering that Adele, who does not recognize him anymore, has started a relationship with a new man at Rose Ridge, he lets her go. In season 8, Richard and Catherine run into each other in the hotel where they are staying while in San Francisco to serve as examiners for the boards and have a one-night stand. However, Catherine's son Jackson (Jesse Williams), who was also there to take his boards and worked under Richard at Seattle Grace Mercy West, is horrified after finding out about the relationship.

While on the way to Bailey's wedding, Richard gets a phone call alerting him that Adele has been rushed to the hospital. Bailey and Meredith perform emergency surgery, which was successful. However, it is revealed that Adele died of a heart attack while recovering in the ICU. He later embarks on a relationship with Catherine.

A storm hits the hospital and creates a power outage. After operating on a former case of Bailey's, he goes in the electrical room and finds the man who was in charge of the generators lying on the ground. He sends him to an OR and stays in the room to restore the power but is seemingly electrocuted.

In the premiere of the tenth season, Richard says that his parents were there at his white coat ceremony. When he gets electrocuted but seasons later, he explains how his mom died when he was younger.

Richard slowly recovers from his electrical injuries after putting Meredith as his POA. Richard returns to work and is given a retirement package from Hunt on his birthday. Richard accepts an offer to become the head of the residency program mentoring the residents. He continues his relationship with Catherine and plans to propose. Richard chats with Dr. Maggie Pierce (Kelly McCreary) after her first day at Grey Sloan Memorial who says that it was surreal to work at a place that shares a name with Ellis Grey, her birth mother. Maggie bears a striking resemblance to Richard, suggesting that he is her father.

As series 11 progresses, it is revealed through moments of flashbacks from Meredith that Maggie is in fact Richard's daughter, and that Ellis gave her up out of shame and suffering from depression. Upon finding out the truth, Richard doesn't tell Maggie the news straight away out of fear Maggie will reject and blame him for giving her up. This causes Richard to act strangely around her, causing Miranda Bailey to wonder if he is sleeping with her, Richard correcting her on this mistake causes other members of staff to find out the truth before Maggie. After the truth is revealed, Maggie is angry with Richard and ignores and rebuffs him for some time. Later on in the season, the pair are seen to have bonded and are now friends, with Richard and Meredith sharing stories with Maggie about Ellis.

In the season 13 episode "The Room Where It Happens," when a male patient is wheeled into the OR, where Meredith, Hunt, and Edwards are waiting, Webber shows up to help having napped all day. Webber wants the patient to be given a name, he picks Gail, a cello player and music teacher. During the episode, each of the doctors has a flashback to a tragic incident from their past. We learn near the end of the episode, Gail was Webber's mother, who had advanced pancreatic cancer and died when he was ten.

Webber again fell ill in season 16, but received treatment and returned in the first episode of season 17 consequently being thrown back in to work in the middle of the Covid-19 pandemic. Meredith gives Webber her power of attorney after contracting the virus, and in the winter finale of season 17, he makes the decision to put her on a ventilator.

Development

Casting and creation

Characterization

References

External links 
Grey's Anatomy at ABC.com

Grey's Anatomy characters
Fictional surgeons
Fictional African-American people
Television characters introduced in 2005
Fictional alcohol abusers
American male characters in television